The International Journal of Kurdish Studies is an academic journal published by the Kurdish Library, and was edited by Vera Beaudin Saeedpour. It publishes scholarly articles about Kurdish culture, literature, and history. It was founded in 1986 as Kurdish Times before getting its current title after volume 4.

International Journal of Kurdish Studies should not be confused with Peeter's Journal of Kurdish Studies (print , electronic ), or Transnational Press London's Kurdish Studies (print , electronic ) journal.

References

External links
 Journal homepage

Kurdish studies
Middle Eastern studies journals
Publications established in 1986